Walt Dickerson 1976 is an album by vibraphonist Walt Dickerson recorded in 1976 for the Japanese Whynot label.

Track listing 
All compositions by Walt Dickerson except where noted.

 "Sky" – 10:17
 "Awareness" – 4:29
 "Keys of Wisdom" – 5:59
 "Yesterdays" (Jerome Kern, Otto Harbach) – 9:24
 "I Love You" (Cole Porter) – 12:00

Personnel 
Walt Dickerson – vibraphone
Wilbur Ware – bass (tracks 3–5)
Jamaaladeen Tacuma – electric bass (track 1)
Edgar Bateman – drums (tracks 1 & 3–5)

References 

1976 albums
Walt Dickerson albums
Whynot Records albums